Tom Smith (26 November 1876 – 1937) was a professional footballer who played for Preston North End, Tottenham Hotspur and Carlisle United.

Football career
Smith began his career at Preston North End in 1895 where he played 53 matches and scored on eight occasions up till 1897. Whilst at Preston, Smith played alongside his namesake, who subsequently joined Southampton.

The outside right went on to join Tottenham Hotspur. He was part of the squad that won the Southern League in 1899–1900 season, and featured in both matches in the 1901 FA Cup Final and scored the second Lilywhite's goal in their cup winning replay. He rejoined Preston in 1903 and played a further eight matches, scoring three goals. He later played for Carlisle United before ending his career at Maryport Tradesmen.

Tom Smith's Tottenham Hotspur 1901 FA Cup Winning Medal was up for auction on 26 October 2015 at Graham Budd Auctions, London.

Personal life
Smith is the older brother of James Lomas, who played rugby league for Salford, and captained the first Great Britain team to tour Australia and New Zealand.

Honours 
Tottenham Hotspur
 Southern League: 1899–1900 - Winner
 1901 FA Cup Final – Winner

References 

Evening News & Star 12/10/2015

1876 births
1937 deaths
People from Maryport
English footballers
English Football League players
Southern Football League players
Preston North End F.C. players
Tottenham Hotspur F.C. players
Carlisle United F.C. players
Association football outside forwards
FA Cup Final players
Footballers from Cumbria